Mitch Fatel (born December 20, 1968 Mitch Faytel in in Manhattan) is a stand-up comedian. He was raised in Yonkers, New York and began doing stand-up at the age of 15. In 1988 Fatel attended NYU/Tisch School of the Arts and majored in film and acting studies. Around this time Mitch was an intern on The Howard Stern Show. When Mitch left the show he brought in a friend of his, John Melendez. John went on to take his place as intern and became known as "Stuttering John".

Fatel performs regularly at the famed Comedy Cellar. He has performed on the Late Show with David Letterman and Late Night with Conan O'Brien and worked as a correspondent on The Tonight Show with Jay Leno  covering major sporting events and conventions. 

In 2004, he released his first CD entitled Miniskirts and Muffins which debuted number one on the iTunes Comedy Charts.

In 2006 he took home honors as "Best Comedian" at the HBO Aspen Comedy Festival. In the same year he released his second CD Super Retardo from Laugh.com.

His first half-hour special aired on April 10, 2007 at 10PM on Comedy Central Presents which was ranked number 6 by viewers in the "Stand Up Showdown".

Tracks from his CDs are often heard on XM Comedy 150 on XM Satellite Radio on Sirius Satellite Radio's Raw Dog Comedy 104 and on Pandora Radio.

References

External links 

 
 

American stand-up comedians
Living people
1968 births
Tisch School of the Arts alumni
20th-century American comedians
21st-century American comedians